Mojstrana is a village in the Municipality of Kranjska Gora in the Upper Carniola region of Slovenia.

Geography
Mojstrana is located in the Upper Sava Valley at the point where Bistrica Creek joins the Sava River below the main road from Jesenice to Kranjska Gora at an elevation of 641 m. The glacial Vrata Valley leads from Mojstrana towards the southwest past Peričnik Falls to the north face of Mount Triglav. The road to three other valleys—Radovna, Krma, and Kot—also begins in Mojstrana.

Name
Mojstrana was first attested in 1763–87 as Moistrana. The suffix -ana indicates that the name is of Romance or pre-Romance origin. The root *mojstr- is believed to be related to Friulian majostre 'strawberry, blueberry' (cf. the oronym Mojstrovka from this root), thus referring to an area rich in strawberries or blueberries.

History
The development of the settlement is connected to ironworks and iron ore in the area as well as a cement works that ceased to operate after the First World War.

Mass grave
Mojstrana is the site of a mass grave associated with the Second World War. It contains the remains of between 10 and 20 German soldiers, and perhaps civilians as well.

Economy
Its inhabitants today are mostly either farmers or work in the local metal, or wood production. Tourism is also important because Mojstrana is the starting point for many routes in the Julian Alps and the Karavanke. Since 7 August 2010, Mojstrana has housed the Slovenian Alpine Museum, which presents the tradition of mountaineering in Slovenia. There is also a small ski slope next to the village.

Sights
Local attractions include the 17th-century church of St. Clement, the small Triglav museum, a giant walnut tree with a 470 cm circumference in the middle of the village, the Šmerc and Ambrož houses, the Vrata Valley with the remnants of an aqueduct for the cement works, Peričnik Falls, and the north face of Triglav.

Notable people
Notable people that were born or lived in Mojstrana include:
Mihael Ambrožič (1846–1904), beekeeper

Gallery

References

External links

 
Mojstrana on Geopedia
 Dovje-Mojstrana Tourist Office

Populated places in the Municipality of Kranjska Gora